Katsuo Ichikawa (born ) is a Japanese wheelchair curler.

He participated in the 2010 Winter Paralympics where the Japanese team finished in tenth and fifth places respectively.

Teams

References

External links 

Profile at the Official Website for the 2010 Winter Paralympics in Vancouver

Living people
1961 births
Japanese male curlers
Japanese wheelchair curlers
Paralympic wheelchair curlers of Japan
Wheelchair curlers at the 2010 Winter Paralympics